Sampatiya Uikey (born 4 September 1967) is an Indian politician who is a  tribal leader of the Bharatiya Janata Party from Madhya Pradesh. On 31 July 2017, she was elected unopposed to the Rajya Sabha from the state of Madhya Pradesh in the bypoll necessitated by the demise of Union Minister Shri Anil Madhav Dave. Her term will end as per the original term on 29 June 2022.

She was president of district Panchayat in Mandla district, Madhya Pradesh.

Her party, Bhartiya Janata Party has become the largest party in the Rajya Sabha with 58 members, overtaking Indian National Congress by one seat with Sampathiya Uikey being sworn in as member of the House of Elders on 4 August 2017.

References

1967 births
Living people
Bharatiya Janata Party politicians from Madhya Pradesh
Rajya Sabha members from Madhya Pradesh
Madhya Pradesh district councillors
People from Mandla district
People from Mandla
Women in Madhya Pradesh politics
21st-century Indian women politicians
21st-century Indian politicians
Women members of the Rajya Sabha